Sir John Shaw Rennie  (12 January 1917 – 12 August 2002) was a British civil servant and the United Nations Relief and Works Agency for Palestine Refugees in the Near East's Commissioner-General from 1971 to 1977.

Early life 
John Rennie was born in Glasgow and educated at Hillhead High School, Glasgow University and Balliol College, Oxford. In 1951 Rennie was appointed Britain's deputy colonial secretary for Mauritius. He was the British Resident in Vanuatu from 1955 to 1962. 

From 1962 to 1968, he was Governor of Mauritius, overseeing Mauritius' transition to independence, including initiating discussions with Dr. Seewoosagur Ramgoolam, the Mauritian premier, over the detachment of the Chagos Islands from Mauritian territory. 

From 1968 to 1971, Rennie was UNRWA deputy Commissioner-General under Laurence Michelmore, who persuaded then-U.N. Secretary-General U Thant to appoint Rennie as his successor.

References 

1917 births
2002 deaths
Governors of British Mauritius
Governors-General of Mauritius
Colonial Administrative Service officers
Knights Grand Cross of the Order of St Michael and St George
Officers of the Order of the British Empire
UNRWA officials
Resident Commissioners of the New Hebrides (United Kingdom)
British officials of the United Nations